Orthaga chionalis is a species of snout moth in the genus Orthaga. It is known from Singapore and New Guinea.

References

Moths described in 1906
Epipaschiinae
Insects of New Guinea
Moths of Singapore